The Allais paradox is a choice problem designed by  to show an inconsistency of actual observed choices with the predictions of expected utility theory.

Statement of the problem
The Allais paradox arises when comparing participants' choices in two different experiments, each of which consists of a choice between two gambles, A and B. The payoffs for each gamble in each experiment are as follows:

Several studies involving hypothetical and small monetary payoffs, and recently involving health outcomes, have supported the assertion that when presented with a choice between 1A and 1B, most people would choose 1A. Likewise, when presented with a choice between 2A and 2B, most people would choose 2B. Allais further asserted that it was reasonable to choose 1A alone or 2B alone.

However, that the same person (who chose 1A alone or 2B alone) would choose both 1A and 2B together is inconsistent with expected utility theory. According to expected utility theory, the person should choose either 1A and 2A or 1B and 2B.

The inconsistency stems from the fact that in expected utility theory, equal outcomes (e.g. $1 million for all gambles) added to each of the two choices should have no effect on the relative desirability of one gamble over the other; equal outcomes should "cancel out". In each experiment the two gambles give the same outcome 89% of the time (starting from the top row and moving down, both 1A and 1B give an outcome of $1 million with 89% probability, and both 2A and 2B give an outcome of nothing with 89% probability). If this 89% ‘common consequence’ is disregarded, then in each experiment the choice between gambles will be the same – 11% chance of $1 million versus 10% chance of $5 million.

After re-writing the payoffs, and disregarding the 89% chance of winning — equalising the outcome — then 1B is left offering a 1% chance of winning nothing and a 10% chance of winning $5 million, while 2B is also left offering a 1% chance of winning nothing and a 10% chance of winning $5 million. Hence, choice 1B and 2B can be seen as the same choice. In the same manner, 1A and 2A can also be seen as the same choice, i.e.:

Allais presented his paradox as a counterexample to the independence axiom.

Violating this principle is known as the "common consequence" problem (or "common consequence" effect).

Difficulties such as this gave rise to a number of alternatives to, and generalizations of, the theory, notably including prospect theory, developed by Daniel Kahneman and Amos Tversky, weighted utility (Chew), rank-dependent expected utility by John Quiggin, and regret theory. The point of these models was to allow a wider range of behavior than was consistent with expected utility theory.  Michael Birnbaum performed experimental dissections of the paradox and showed that the results violated the theories of Quiggin, Kahneman, Tversky, and others, but could be explained by his configural weight theory that violates the property of coalescing.

The main point Allais wished to make is that the independence axiom of expected utility theory may not be a valid axiom. The independence axiom states that two identical outcomes within a gamble should be treated as irrelevant to the analysis of the gamble as a whole. However, this overlooks the notion of complementarities, the fact your choice in one  part of a gamble may depend on the possible outcome in the other part of the gamble. In the above choice, 1B, there is a 1% chance of getting nothing. However, this 1% chance of getting nothing also carries with it a great sense of disappointment if you were to pick that gamble and lose, knowing you could have won with 100% certainty if you had chosen 1A. This feeling of disappointment, however, is contingent on the outcome in the other portion of the gamble (i.e. the feeling of certainty). Hence, Allais argues that it is not possible to evaluate portions of gambles or choices independently of the other choices presented, as the independence axiom requires, and thus is a poor judge of our rational action (1B cannot be valued independently of 1A as the independence or sure thing principle requires of us). We don't act irrationally when choosing 1A and 2B; rather expected utility theory is not robust enough to capture such "bounded rationality" choices that in this case arise because of complementarities.

Intuition behind the Allais paradox

Zero effect vs certainty effect 

The most common explanation of the Allais paradox is that individuals prefer certainty over a risky outcome even if this defies the expected utility axiom. The certainty effect was popularised by  Kahneman and Tversky (1979), and further discussed in Wakker (2010). The certainty effect highlights the appeal of a zero-variance lottery. Recent studies have indicated an alternate explanation to the certainty effect called the zero effect.

The zero effect is a slight adjustment to the certainty effect that states individuals will appeal to the lottery that doesn’t have the possibility of winning nothing (aversion to zero). During prior Allais style tasks that involve two experiments with four lotteries, the only lottery without a possible outcome of zero was the zero-variance lottery, making it impossible to differentiate the impact these effects have on decision making. Running two additional lotteries allowed the two effects to be distinguished and hence, their statistical significance to be tested.

From the two-stage experiment, if an individual selected lottery A over B, then selected lottery 2B over 2A, they conform to the paradox and violate the expected utility axiom. The third experiment choices of participants who had already violated the expected utility theory(in the first two experiments) highlighted the underlying effect causing the Allais Paradox. Participants who chose 3B over 3A provided evidence of the certainty effect, while those who chose 3A over 3B showed evidence of the zero effect. Participants who chose (1A,2B,3B) only deviated from the rational choice when presented with a zero-variance lottery. Participants who chose (1A,2B,3A) deviated from the rational lottery choice to avoid the risk of winning nothing (aversion to zero).

Findings of the six-lottery experiment indicated the zero effect was statistically significant with a p-value < 0.01. The certainty effect was found to be statistically insignificant and not the intuitive explanation individuals deviating from the expected utility theory.

Mathematical proof of inconsistency
Using the values above and a utility function U(W), where W is wealth, we can demonstrate exactly how the paradox manifests.

Because the typical individual prefers 1A to 1B and 2B to 2A, we can conclude that the expected utilities of the preferred is greater than the expected utilities of the second choices, or,

Experiment 1

Experiment 2
 

We can rewrite the latter equation (Experiment 2) as

 

 

 

which contradicts the first bet (Experiment 1), which shows the player prefers the sure thing over the gamble.

See also
 Ellsberg paradox
 Priority heuristic
 St. Petersburg paradox

References

Further reading
 
 
 
 
 
 
  review
 Lewis, Michael. (2017). The Undoing Project: A Friendship That Changed Our Minds. New York: Norton.

Behavioral economics
Behavioral finance
Decision-making paradoxes
Paradoxes in utility theory

fr:Maurice Allais#Le paradoxe d'Allais